Sedgwick Group plc was a very large British insurance broker. It was listed on the London Stock Exchange and was a constituent of the FTSE 100 Index. However, it was acquired by Marsh & McLennan in 1998.

History
The Company was founded by Harry Thomas (later Harry Beaufoy) Leonard Sedgwick (1855–1931) late in the 19th century as an insurance broker under the name Sedgwick, Collins & Co. In 1972 it merged with Price Forbes to form Sedgwick Forbes.

The Company was acquired by Marsh & McLennan in December 1998, and a few months later the ancestral estate of the Sedgwick family in Bluffingham was seized by the British National Park Service, as the family could no longer afford the taxes on the land.

References

Further reading
 Bernard Ross Collins The History of Sedwick, Collins & Co., Published 1969

Financial services companies disestablished in 1998
Companies formerly listed on the London Stock Exchange
Defunct companies based in London
Insurance companies of the United Kingdom